Rosh Hashanah L'Ma'sar Behemah ( "New Year for Tithing Animals") or Rosh Hashanah LaBehemot ( "New Year for (Domesticated) Animals") is one of the four New Year's day festivals (Rashei Hashanah) in the Jewish calendar as indicated in the Mishnah. During the time of the Temple, this was a day on which shepherds determined which of their mature animals were to be tithed. The day coincides with Rosh Chodesh Elul, the New Moon for the month of Elul, exactly one month before Rosh Hashanah.

Beginning in 2009, the festival began to be revived by religious Jewish animal protection advocates and environmental educators to raise awareness of the mitzvah of tsar baalei chayim, the source texts informing Jewish ethical relationships with domesticated animals, and the lived experience of animals impacted by human needs, especially in the industrial meat industry.

Origin 

The Mishnah in Seder Moed Rosh Hashanah 1:1 indicates there are four New Year's Day festivals (Rosh Hashanot) that take place over the course of the year: "The first of Elul is the Rosh HaShanah for tithing behemah (domesticated animals)." A minority opinion holds that the festival occurs on the first of the month of Tishrei. This disagreement is explained in the Babylonian Talmud Rosh Hashanah 8a as a difference of opinion between Rabbi Meir, who holds that the animals conceive in the month of Adar, and Rabbi Elazar and Rabbi Shimon, who hold that the animals conceive in the month of Nissan and give birth in Elul.

Ritual 

In the Temple era, the tithing of the animals on Rosh Hashanah L'Ma'sar Behemah occurred by means of passing animals through a narrow opening in a pen where every tenth animal was marked with red paint.

Modern revival 

Informal celebrations of Rosh Hashanah LaBehemot began in 2009 at the goat barn of Adamah Farm on the campus of the Isabella Freedman Jewish Retreat Center, including a blessing of assembled farm and pet animals, and a meditation on beginning the period of cheshbon hanefesh with a personal accounting of all the domesticated animals relied upon, followed by the shofar blast for Rosh Chodesh Elul. Activists have reached out to synagogues and Jewish food, environment, and animal protection organizations, in order to raise the profile of the festival and raise awareness for the conditions of domesticated animals in contemporary society in Jewish communities. In 2012, the first guided ritual communal meals for Rosh Hashanah LaBehemot were held at the Ginger House in Jerusalem, and in major cities across the United States. Several prominent Masorti and Open Orthodox rabbis have since lent their support for reviving the festival, including Adam Frank, Yitz Greenberg, Jonathan Wittenberg, David Wolpe, and Shmuly Yanklowitz.

Rosh Chodesh Elul 

Rosh Hashanah L'Ma'sar Behemah coincides with Rosh Ḥodesh Elul.

Commencing the first of Elul (and continuing throughout the month), the shofar is blown at the end of the shacharit morning service in anticipation of Rosh Hashanah.

The period of heshbon hanefesh (the traditional accounting for one's relationships during the month of Elul) begins on this day. (This period of self-reflection and relationship repair is also commonly referred to as Elul Zman, the Elul season.)

References

External links 
 Rosh haShanah la-Behemah sourcesheet (at the Sefaria Project)
 Rosh haShanah la-Behemah resources (at the Open Siddur Project)
 Kavvanah on the Blowing of the Shofar on Rosh Ḥodesh Elul for Rosh haShanah la-Behemah
 Rosh Hashanah la-Behemah Facebook Page
 New Year for the Animals Resources (Hazon) 

Elul observances
Minor Jewish holidays
Observances held on the new moon